Senator Freeman may refer to:

Aaron Freeman (politician) (fl. 2010s), Indiana State Senate
Glenn Freeman (1933–2014), Kentucky State Senate
Habern W. Freeman (born 1941), Maryland State Senate
Jonathan Freeman (representative) (1745–1808), New Hampshire State Senate
Mary Lou Freeman (1941–2006), Iowa State Senate
Michael O. Freeman (born 1948), Minnesota State Senate
Robert D. Freeman (1921–2001), Ohio State Senate